Sonny's Famous Steaks is a cheesesteak restaurant that was founded in 1999 on Market St in Philadelphia. The restaurant has been highly ranked for its cheesesteaks since 2001.

History

Sonny's opened in 1999. It is currently owned by Ellen Mogell and Kevin Bagby. Kevin Bagby, began working at Sonny's in 2001 while he was a Temple University student. Bagby claims he ate a lot of cheesesteaks while working there and started Brazilian jiu-jitsu to lose weight. Sonny's won Best of Philly's Best Cheesesteak in 2001.

In 2013, Sonny's underwent renovations and created its current black and white design. The interior is black with white walls and an old storefront look with "chrome-rimmed, fifties-style, communal tables".

In 2014, GQ Magazine ranked Sonny's as the best cheesesteak in Philadelphia. The rankings were published in an article by food correspondent Alan Richman. Twenty-three cheesesteaks were evaluated by five judges -- Richman, University of Pennsylvania physician Benjamin Abella, a former Philadelphia Magazine restaurant critic Maria Gallagher, Chicago Magazine restaurant critic Jeff Ruby, and Philadelphia sports broadcaster Ray Didinger.

John L. Dorman of The New York Times recommended Sonny's for an "authentic cheesesteak experience" over Pat's King of Steaks and Geno's Steaks. 

Serious Eats's founder Ed Levine and editor Niki Achitoff-Gray tried over 30 cheesesteaks in two days and said Sonny's was in their favorite four, which also included Dalessandro's Steaks, John's Roast Pork and Campo's. Arthur Etchells of Philadelphia magazine's food blog Foobooz agreed, ranking John's and Sonny's above Dalessandro's and Campo's.

See also
 List of submarine sandwich restaurants

References

External links
 

Submarine sandwich restaurants
Restaurants in Philadelphia
1999 establishments in Pennsylvania
Restaurants established in 1999